Juicy may refer to:

People
 Juicy J (born 1975), American rapper
 Joe Giudice, nicknamed Juicy Joe, on The Real Housewives of New Jersey

Music
 Juicy (band), a 1980s American R&B duo
 Juicy (album), by Willie Bobo, 1967

Songs
 "Juicy" (Doja Cat song), 2019
"Juicy" (Better Than Ezra song), 2005
 "Juicy" (The Notorious B.I.G. song), 1994
 "Juicy", by Koda Kumi from the single "4 Hot Wave"
 "Juicy", by Pretty Ricky from Bluestars

Other uses
 Juicy!, a Philippine entertainment news program
 Juicy Couture, a clothing line

See also 
 
 Jewcy, an online magazine and user community
 Jucy (disambiguation)
 Juissi, a Finnish brand of juices and energy drinks
 Juice (disambiguation)